1938 was the 45th season of County Championship cricket in England. England established a world record team total of 903 for seven declared against Australia at The Oval with Len Hutton contributing a record 364. The series ended in a 1–1 draw. Yorkshire were champions for the 20th time.

Honours
County Championship – Yorkshire
Minor Counties Championship – Buckinghamshire
Wisden – Hugh Bartlett, Bill Brown, Denis Compton, Kenneth Farnes, Arthur Wood

Test series

England and Australia drew the series 1–1 with two matches drawn and one game abandoned without a ball being bowled.

County Championship

Leading batsmen
Don Bradman topped the averages with 2429 runs @ 115.66

Leading bowlers
Bill Bowes topped the averages with 121 wickets @ 15.23

References

Annual reviews
 Wisden Cricketers' Almanack 1939

Further reading
 Bill Frindall, The Wisden Book of Test Cricket 1877-1978, Wisden, 1979
 Chris Harte, A History of Australian Cricket, Andre Deutsch, 1993
 Ray Robinson, On Top Down Under, Cassell, 1975

External links
 CricketArchive – season summary

1938 in English cricket
English cricket seasons in the 20th century